Sir Gerard Aloysius Wall (24 January 1920 – 22 November 1992) was a surgeon and a politician in New Zealand. He was Speaker of the New Zealand House of Representatives from 1985 to 1987. He was a member of the Labour Party.

Wall was noted for his firmly held socially conservative views and opposition to legalising abortion and homosexuality, which frequently brought him into conflict with his contemporaries. Porirua Mayor John Burke said of Wall "He was a man who had the courage of his convictions – if he felt strongly about any issue it concerned him little who or how many disagreed."

Biography

Early life and career
Born in Christchurch, New Zealand, in 1920, he was the son of Edmund Wall. He was educated at St Bede's College, then Canterbury University College and the University of Otago, graduating with an MBChB. After graduation he worked as a house surgeon in Christchurch and as a general practitioner in Denniston on the West Coast.

He married Uru Raupo Cameron in 1951, a nurse from Northland. They had two sons and three daughters.

He went to Britain and qualified as a Fellow of the Royal College of Surgeons, specialising in orthopaedic and plastic surgery. On return to New Zealand he became medical superintendent of Wairau Hospital, Blenheim from 1960 until 1969.

Political career

Wall first entered politics at a local level and was a member of both the Marlborough Hospital Board and Blenheim Borough Council.

While in Blenheim, he first stood for Parliament in the  against the incumbent Tom Shand of the National Party in the  electorate, cutting Shand's majority from 2,111 to 732, but was unsuccessful. Soon afterwards was invited to contest the Labour nomination in the 1967 Petone by-election. As a non-resident of the Wellington area, his mentioning caused surprise, ultimately however he was not selected as the candidate.

Wall was a member of the Catholic faith and his socially conservative views frequently led him to clash with other Labour MPs and party members. He, like Norman Kirk, was staunchly opposed abortion. At the 1972 Labour Party conference Wall chaired the health policy committee. A pro-choice remit was submitted to the committee reading "That the Labour Party when it becomes the government will give favourable consideration to liberalising the present legislation on abortion" which Wall recommended be amended to instead read "That we acknowledge the growing interest and concern to the world over the moral, medical and social problems involved in abortion. We believe that such a grave moral, medical and social issue is not one for hasty action, and that steps should be taken to establish reliably and authoritatively all relevant information and facts on abortion in New Zealand before any action is considered" which caused a notably heated debate on the conference floor. His opposition to abortion went as far as to introduce a bill aimed at closing private abortion clinics. Wall's next clash with colleagues came over the Crimes Amendment Bill 1975 which would have legalised "homosexual acts" between consenting males over 20, which he opposed. Wall went as far as to propose a two-year prison sentence for anyone telling persons under the age of 20 that homosexual behavior was normal. When the vote was held Wall (as Speaker) did not vote against the bill however.

Wall had a reputation as a "prickly character" and his inclination to follow his convictions, even when they contradicted his colleagues, cost him political advancement. Consequently, he was overlooked for a place in cabinet during both the Third and Fourth Labour Governments. He was also twice challenged for the Labour Party nomination in Porirua. In the lead up to the  he was challenged for the nomination by Rosslyn Noonan, a feminist activist, in protest to his anti-abortion stance and members bill to close private abortion clinics, but was successful in defeating her challenge. In the lead up to the  the Porirua Labour Electorate Committee passed a motion of no confidence in him as part of an unsuccessful attempt to de-select him as the candidate. Parliamentary colleague Mike Moore said "He [Wall] was a man of fierce and strong opinions ... he was a unique character who made great sacrifices for his principles."

He was elected as Speaker following Sir Basil Arthur's death in 1985 and served in this role until 1987. Prior to this Wall had been upset at being passed over for any responsibilities following Labour's victory and thus took to the role of speaker with enthusiasm. Colleagues thought he had a tendency to overdo his role and was too tough on opposition MPs, almost every one was ejected from the chamber at least once during his two years as speaker. As speaker he was the target of an unprecedented attack on his integrity by Sir Robert Muldoon in 1986. Muldoon issued a lengthy statement criticising how he thought Wall chaired sessions, particularly Wall's predilection for ejecting members from the house. Muldoon had previously moved a motion of no confidence in Wall (a rare occurrence) which was defeated.

He was replaced in the Porirua electorate by Graham Kelly.

Later life and death
Wall retired in 1987 and was appointed a Knight Bachelor in the 1987 Queen's Birthday Honours. He died in 1992.

Notes

References

|-

1920 births
1992 deaths
New Zealand Labour Party MPs
Speakers of the New Zealand House of Representatives
Members of the New Zealand House of Representatives
Fellows of the Royal College of Surgeons
New Zealand orthopaedic surgeons
People from Christchurch
People educated at St Bede's College, Christchurch
New Zealand politicians awarded knighthoods
University of Otago alumni
New Zealand Knights Bachelor
20th-century New Zealand medical doctors
Unsuccessful candidates in the 1966 New Zealand general election
New Zealand MPs for North Island electorates
Local politicians in New Zealand
20th-century surgeons